Saroj Mukherjee (14 January 1911 – 9 February 1990) was an Indian freedom fighter and a member of the Polit Bureau of the Communist Party of India (Marxist). He was also the secretary of the West Bengal state committee of the Communist party.

Early life 
He was born in Bahadurpur, Paschim Bardhaman in erstwhile Bengal Presidency of British India (now in West Bengal, India). His father was Shikkhabroti Trilochan. He joined political activities from the beginning of 1920s. In 1928 he passed Matriculation from Burdwan Municipal High School. He passed I.Sc. from Serampore College with scholarship.

As a student at the age of thirteen, Mukherjee joined the Indian freedom movement, joining the Indian National Congress party in 1924 along with his friend Benoy Chowdhury. He also joined the Jugantar group in 1928. While studying in Serampore College, he and Benoy Chowdhury became acquainted with Dr. Bhupendranath Datta and Communist leaders Muzaffar Ahmed and Abdul Halim.

Political activities 
In 1930, he participated in the Civil Disobedience movement and got jailed. After being released got admitted in Vidyasagar College. He was again arrested before he could sit for his B.A. examination. While in jail he passed B.A. and studied for M.A. and law. He was released from jail in 1938.

He joined the Communist Party of India in 1931 and went to work for them full-time in 1938.

In 1941, Saroj Mukherjee married Kanak Dasgupta, who was also a Communist leader.

From 1939 to 1943, he was the Kolkata District Committee Secretary of CPI. Between 1943 to 1948 and 1951 to 1962, he was a member of Bengal State.Committee of CPI and National Council of CPI.

Mukherjee was the editor of the Bengali daily Swadhinata from 1956 to 1962. Later, he was the first editor and publisher of CPI(M)'s newspaper Ganashakti, which position he held until his death. He was one of the founder-members of CPI(M), when CPI got divided in 1964. He was a member of the Central Committee of CPI(M) until his death. He was elected from Katwa (Lok Sabha constituency) in Barddhaman in 1971. After the death of Pramode Dasgupta in 1982, he became the West Bengal State Secretary of CPI(M). In 1986 he became a Politburo member of CPI(M).

Several books were written by him including:

 Trade Union-er gorar kotha
 1905 saler rush biplob
 Swadhinatar Juge Rangpur
 Trade Union Andoloner Notun Dhara
 Tinti Dashak
 Dui Pathikrit
 Duiti Smaraniyo Din
 Rajniti o Sangbadikota
 Bharater Communist Party o Amra

He died on 10 February 1990.

See also
Communist Party of India (Marxist)
Kanak Mukherjee

References

Bengali Hindus
1990 deaths
Communist Party of India (Marxist) politicians from West Bengal
Politicians from Kolkata
1911 births
India MPs 1971–1977
Lok Sabha members from West Bengal
People from Purba Bardhaman district
20th-century Bengalis
Indian newspaper editors
20th-century Indian non-fiction writers
Indian political writers
Indian Marxist writers
20th-century Indian male writers
Indian Marxist journalists
Indian Communist writers
20th-century Indian journalists
Indian political journalists
Bengali-language writers